Corvina is a wine grape variety.

Corvina may also refer to:

Fish
 Cilus gilberti, a marine fish of the family Sciaenidae, native to the Pacific coast of South America
 Cynoscion othonopterus, or Gulf corvina, native to the Gulf of California
 Cynoscion parvipinnis
 Cynoscion stolzmanni or yellowtail corvina, a species of fish of the genus Cynoscion
 Isopisthus parvipinnis, a species of fish native to the Atlantic and Caribbean from Brazil to Costa Rica
 Isopisthus remifer
 Larimichthys polyactis or the yellow corvina, another fish, native to the Pacific coast of Asia